In mathematics, the Gateaux differential or Gateaux derivative is a generalization of the concept of directional derivative in differential calculus. Named after René Gateaux, a French mathematician who died young in World War I, it is defined for functions between locally convex topological vector spaces such as Banach spaces.  Like the Fréchet derivative on a Banach space, the Gateaux differential is often used to formalize the functional derivative commonly used in the calculus of variations and physics.

Unlike other forms of derivatives, the Gateaux differential of a function may be nonlinear. However, often the definition of the Gateaux differential also requires that it be a continuous linear transformation. In most applications, continuous linearity follows from some more primitive condition which is natural to the particular setting, such as imposing complex differentiability in the context of infinite dimensional holomorphy or continuous differentiability in nonlinear analysis.

Definition

If the limit exists for all  then one says that  is Gateaux differentiable at 

In some cases, a weak limit is taken instead of a strong limit, which leads to the notion of a weak Gateaux derivative.

Linearity and continuity

At each point  the Gateaux differential defines a function

This function is homogeneous in the sense that for all scalars 

However, this function need not be additive, so that the Gateaux differential may fail to be linear, unlike the Fréchet derivative. Furthermore, for Gateaux differentials that  linear and continuous in  there are several inequivalent ways to formulate their continuous differentiability.

For example, consider the real-valued function  of two real variables defined by

Relation with the Fréchet derivative

If  is Fréchet differentiable, then it is also Gateaux differentiable, and its Fréchet and Gateaux derivatives agree.  The converse is clearly not true, since the Gateaux derivative may fail to be linear or continuous.  In fact, it is even possible for the Gateaux derivative to be linear and continuous but for the Fréchet derivative to fail to exist.

Furthermore, if  is (complex) Gateaux differentiable at each  with derivative

This is analogous to the result from basic complex analysis that a function is analytic if it is complex differentiable in an open set, and is a fundamental result in the study of infinite dimensional holomorphy.

Continuous differentiability

Continuous Gateaux differentiability may be defined in two inequivalent ways. Suppose that  is Gateaux differentiable at each point of the open set   One notion of continuous differentiability in  requires that the mapping on the product space

be continuous.

A stronger notion of continuous differentiability requires that

be a continuous mapping

The former is the more common definition in areas of nonlinear analysis where the function spaces involved are not necessarily Banach spaces. For instance, differentiation in Fréchet spaces has applications such as the Nash–Moser inverse function theorem in which the function spaces of interest often consist of smooth functions on a manifold.

Higher derivatives

Whereas higher order Fréchet derivatives are naturally defined as multilinear functions by iteration, using the isomorphisms  higher order Gateaux derivative cannot be defined in this way.  Instead the th order Gateaux derivative of a function  in the direction  is defined by

Rather than a multilinear function, this is instead a homogeneous function of degree  in 

There is another candidate for the definition of the higher order derivative, the function

For instance, the following sufficient condition holds .

is continuous.

relating the second order derivative  with the differential   Similar conclusions hold for higher order derivatives.

Properties

A version of the fundamental theorem of calculus holds for the Gateaux derivative of  provided  is assumed to be sufficiently continuously differentiable.  Specifically:

Many of the other familiar properties of the derivative follow from this, such as multilinearity and commutativity of the higher-order derivatives.  Further properties, also consequences of the fundamental theorem, include:

Example

Let  be the Hilbert space of square-integrable functions on a Lebesgue measurable set  in the Euclidean space  The functional

Indeed, the above is the limit  of

See also

References

 .
 .
 
 .
 .
 
 .
 .

Generalizations of the derivative
Topological vector spaces